The men's nine-pin singles event  in bowling at the 2005 World Games took place from 15 to 16 July 2005 at the Sporthalle Krefelder Straße in Duisburg, Germany.

Competition format
A total of 10 athletes entered the competition. Best eight athletes from preliminary round qualifies to the semifinal. From semifinal the best four athletes qualifies to the final.

Results

Preliminary

Semifinal

Final

References

External links
 Results on IWGA website

Bowling at the 2005 World Games